Judy Winter (born Beate Richard; 4 January 1944) is a German actress. She resides in Berlin.

Filmography

Film 
1970: The Sex Nest
1970:  (Hard Women)
1970: 
1971: Und Jimmy ging zum Regenbogen — (based on a novel by Johannes Mario Simmel)
1971: Love Is Only a Word — (based on a novel by Johannes Mario Simmel)
1972: Shadows Unseen
1973: 
1974: 
1980: 
1980: Der Mann, der sich in Luft auflöste — (based on The Man Who Went Up in Smoke by Sjöwall and Wahlöö)
1984: Ärztinnen — (based on a play by Rolf Hochhuth)
1997: Rosenkavalier

Television 
1963: Erwin und Elmire — (based on Erwin und Elmire)
1965: Held Henry — (based on Henry V)
1966: Frühlings Erwachen — (based on Spring Awakening)
1966: Die Unberatenen — (based on a novel by )
1971: "Hamburg Transit": Blondinen im Schussfeld
1973: Im Zeichen der Kälte
1973: "Sonderdezernat K1": Kassensturz um Mitternacht
1973:  — (based on a novel by Nicolas Freeling)
1973: "Der Kommissar": Tod eines Buchhändlers
1974: Zinngeschrei — (based on a radio play by Günter Eich)
1974: Frau von Bebenburg — (based on a story by Arthur Schnitzler)
1975: "Tatort": Tod eines Einbrechers
1975: Schließfach 763
1975: "Berlin – 0:00 bis 24:00"
1975: Im Werk notiert
1975: "Derrick" – Season 2, Episode 7: "Hoffmanns Höllenfahrt"
1975: Im Hause des Kommerzienrates — (based on a novel by E. Marlitt)
1976: "Derrick" – Season 3, Episode 10: "Das Bordfest"
1976: Partner gesucht
1977: "Sonderdezernat K1": Tod eines Schrankenwärters
1977: "Tatort": Reifezeugnis (For Your Love Only)
1978: Die Eingeschlossenen — (based on The Condemned of Altona)
1978: Angst — (based on Fear)
1979: Nathan der Weise — (based on Nathan the Wise)
1979: "Derrick" – Season 6, Episode 9: "Ein Kongreß in Berlin"
1979: Glücksucher — (screenplay by )
1980: Eingriffe
1981: Ein zauberhaftes Biest
1981: Kinder
1981:  — (based on a novel by Jakob Wassermann)
1982: Stella — (based on a play by Goethe)
1982: Die Stunde des Löwen
1982: Dr. Margarete Johnsohn — (based on a play by )
1982: Der Auslöser
1983: Die Falle
1984: 
1984: "Geschichten aus Kalmüsel" – Zwei schwarze Schafe
1984: Der Besuch — (based on a play by Francis Durbridge)
1985: Le Paria
1986: Vicky und Nicky
1986: Der Schatz im Niemandsland
1986: Jimmy Allegretto
1986: Die Fräulein von damals
1986: Die Brücke am schwarzen Fluß
1988:  — (based on a story by )
1988: Ich melde einen Selbstmord
1988: Aufrichtige Lügnerin
1989: Tam, Tam oder Wohin die Reise geht
1989: Besuch
1990: 
1991: Tod auf Bali
1992: Der Fotograf oder Das Auge Gottes
1992: "Wolffs Revier": Wohnungstod
1993: König & Consorten
1993: Ein unvergessliches Wochenende ... auf Capri
1993: "Glückliche Reise": Südafrika
1993: Vater braucht eine Frau
1993: "Ein Fall für zwei": Gelegenheit macht Mörder
1994: "Ein Fall für zwei": Das fremde Herz
1994: "Doppelter Einsatz": Schichtwechsel
1995: Sterne des Südens
1995: "A.S.": Bitte töte ihn
1995: 
1996: Butterfly Feelings
1996: Ehebruch: Eine teuflische Falle!
1996: Wem gehört Tobias?
1996: Willkommen in Kronstadt
1998: Durch dick & dünn
1998: "Im Namen des Gesetzes": Der letzte Schlag
1999: "Dr. Sommerfeld – Neues vom Bülowbogen": Die Eisprinzessin
2001: "SOKO 5113": Nach dreißig Jahren
2002: "Alphateam – Die Lebensretter im OP": Rettet mein Kind
2003: Auch Erben will gelernt sein
2003: Mädchen, böses Mädchen
2003: "Der kleine Mönch": Arme Reiche
2005: Brücke zum Herzen
2006: "In aller Freundschaft": Schein und Sein
2008: 
2012:

External links 

Personal Site 
Potzern Agency Berlin 
ZBF Agency Berlin 
Judy Winter, great Interview with Pictures 

1944 births
German film actresses
German television actresses
20th-century German actresses
21st-century German actresses
Living people
Recipients of the Order of Merit of Berlin